Tomáš Kapusta (born 4 July 1995) is a Slovak football midfielder who currently plays for club FK Senica.

FK Senica 
Kapusta made his official debut for FK Senica on 4 May 2012, playing the last 7 minutes in a 2–0 home win against MFK Ružomberok.

External links 
 FK Senica profile

References

1995 births
Living people
Association football midfielders
Slovak footballers
FK Senica players
Slovak Super Liga players